The Netherlands Football League Championship 1946–1947 was contested by 66 teams participating in six divisions. The national champion would be determined by a play-off featuring the winners of the eastern, northern, two southern and two western football divisions of the Netherlands. AFC Ajax won this year's championship by beating sc Heerenveen, NEC Nijmegen, MVV Maastricht, BVV Den Bosch and Blauw-Wit Amsterdam.

New entrants
Eerste Klasse East:
Promoted from 2nd Division: Vitesse Arnhem
Eerste Klasse North:
Promoted from 2nd Division: FC Emmen
Eerste Klasse South-I:
Moving in from South-II: VVV Venlo
Promoted from 2nd Division: Helmondia
Eerste Klasse South-II:
Moving in from South-I: FC Eindhoven
Promoted from 2nd Division: Sittardse Boys
Eerste Klasse West-I:
Moving in from West-II: DWS, Feijenoord and Sparta Rotterdam
Eerste Klasse West-II:
Moving in from West-I: DOS, De Volewijckers and Xerxes
Promoted from 2nd Division: SBV Excelsior

Divisions

Eerste Klasse East

Eerste Klasse North

Eerste Klasse South-I

Eerste Klasse South-II

Eerste Klasse West-I

Eerste Klasse West-II

Championship play-off

References
RSSSF Netherlands Football League Championships 1898-1954
RSSSF Eerste Klasse Oost
RSSSF Eerste Klasse Noord
RSSSF Eerste Klasse Zuid
RSSSF Eerste Klasse West

Netherlands Football League Championship seasons
1946–47 in Dutch football
Neth